John A. Bradley (born c. 1945) was a lieutenant general in the United States Air Force who served as Commander of the United States Air Force Reserve Command, Headquarters U.S. Air Force, Washington D.C., and commander, Headquarters Air Force Reserve, a separate operating agency located at Robins Air Force Base, Georgia. As chief of Air Force Reserve, he served as the principal adviser on Reserve matters to the Air Force Chief of Staff. As commander of AFRES, he had full responsibility for the supervision of U.S. Air Force Reserve units around the world.

Bradley was born in Lebanon, Tennessee. He was commissioned in 1967 after completing the Air Force ROTC program as a distinguished graduate at the University of Tennessee at Knoxville.

As a fighter pilot, Bradley flew 337 combat missions in Vietnam. He has commanded a fighter training squadron, fighter group, fighter wing and numbered air force. He also served as Deputy to the Chief of the Air Force Reserve and as the Deputy Commander of Joint Task Force - Computer Network Operations. Before assuming his current position, Bradley was Assistant to the Chairman of the Joint Chiefs of Staff for Reserve Matters. The general is a command pilot with more than 7,000 flying hours in the T-38, A-37, A-10, F-4 and F-16. He retired on August 23, 2008.

His awards include the Distinguished Service Medal with oak leaf cluster, Defense Superior Service Medal, Legion of Merit, Distinguished Flying Cross, Defense Meritorious Service Medal, Meritorious Service Medal with oak leaf cluster, Air Medal with three silver oak leaf clusters, Air Force Commendation Medal, Air Force Achievement Medal, Joint Meritorious Unit Award with three oak leaf clusters, Air Force Outstanding Unit Award with "V" device and silver and bronze oak leaf clusters, Air Force Organizational Excellence Award, Combat Readiness Medal with silver and bronze oak leaf clusters, National Defense Service Medal with two bronze stars, Armed Forces Expeditionary Medal, Vietnam Service Medal with three bronze stars, Southwest Asia Service Medal with bronze star, Global War on Terrorism Service Medal, Armed Forces Service Medal, Humanitarian Service Medal, Air Force Overseas Ribbon-Short, Air Force Longevity Service Award Ribbon with silver and three bronze oak leaf clusters, Armed Forces Reserve Medal with "M" device and hourglass, Small Arms Expert Marksmanship Ribbon with bronze star, Air Force Training Ribbon, Republic of Vietnam Gallantry Cross with Palm, Republic of Vietnam Campaign Medal, and the Kuwait Liberation Medal (Government of Kuwait).

Education
1967 Bachelor of science degree in mathematics, University of Tennessee Knoxville
1978 National Security Management course, Fort Lesley J. McNair, Washington, DC
1996 Program for Senior Executives in National and International Security, John F. Kennedy School of Government, Harvard University, Cambridge, MA
2000 National Security Leadership course, Maxwell School of Citizenship and Public Affairs, Syracuse University, Syracuse, NY

Assignments
September 1967 - February 1969, mathematician/program analyst, 544th Aerospace Reconnaissance Technical Wing, Offutt AFB, Neb.
 February 1969 - March 1970, student, undergraduate pilot training, Sheppard AFB, Texas
 March 1970 - July 1970, A-37 pilot combat training, England AFB, La.
 July 1970 - August 1971, A-37 fighter pilot, 8th Special Operations Squadron, Bien Hoa Air Base, South Vietnam
 August 1971 - April 1973, T-38 instructor pilot, 50th Flying Training Squadron, Columbus AFB, Miss.
 April 1973 - September 1978, A-37 instructor pilot, 47th Tactical Fighter Squadron, Barksdale AFB, La.
 September 1978 - February 1981, chief of standardization and evaluation, 917th Tactical Fighter Group, Barksdale AFB, La.
 February 1981 - August 1983, assistant operations officer, later, operations officer, 47th Tactical Fighter Squadron, Barksdale AFB, La.
 August 1983 - July 1985, Deputy Commander for Operations, 917th Tactical Fighter Group, Barksdale AFB, La.
July 1985 - December 1988, Commander, 924th Tactical Fighter Group, Bergstrom AFB, Texas
December 1988 - July 1989, Deputy Chief of Staff for Operations, 10th Air Force, Bergstrom AFB, Texas
July 1989 - January 1993, Commander, 442nd Fighter Wing, Richards-Gebaur AFB, Mo.
February 1993 - February 1998, Deputy to the Chief of Air Force Reserve, Headquarters U.S. Air Force, Washington, D.C.
February 1998 - March 2002, Commander, 10th Air Force, Naval Air Station Joint Reserve Base, Fort Worth, Texas
March 2002 - December 2002, Deputy Commander, Joint Task Force-Computer Network Operations, U.S. Space Command, Arlington, Va.
December 2002 - June 2004, Assistant to the Chairman, Joint Chiefs of Staff for Reserve Matters, the Pentagon, Washington, D.C.
June 2004 - 2008, Chief of Air Force Reserve, Headquarters U.S. Air Force, Washington D.C., and Commander, Air Force Reserve Command, Robins AFB, Ga.

References

1940s births
Living people